Manon Livingstone (born 28 January 1997) is an Australian handball player for Pays de Grasse Handball ASPTT and the Australian national team.

She represented Australia at the 2019 World Women's Handball Championship in Japan, where the Australian team placed 24th.

References

Australian female handball players
1997 births
Living people
Expatriate handball players
Australian expatriate sportspeople in France